Frederick George Shaw (6 March 1877 – 24 March 1954) was an Australian rules footballer who played with Fitzroy in the Victorian Football League (VFL).

Notes

External links 

1877 births
1954 deaths
Australian rules footballers from Ballarat
Fitzroy Football Club players